Bernie may refer to:

Places in the United States
 Bernie, Missouri, a city
 Griffithsville, West Virginia, also called Bernie

People
 Bernie (given name)
 Bernie Sanders, United States senator and 2016 and 2020 Democratic presidential candidate
 Bernie (surname)

Films
 Bernie (1996 film), a French film
 Bernie (2011 film), directed by Richard Linklater
 Weekend At Bernie's (1989 film), directed by Ted Kotcheff

Television
 Bernie, a British comedy series running from 1978 to 1980 featuring Bernie Winters

See also
 Bern (disambiguation)
 Berne (disambiguation)
 Berny (disambiguation)